Zwiers is a Dutch patronymic surname. Zwier is a now rather uncommon given name, a short form of the Germanic name Sweder with the roots swind ("strong") and her ("lord, army"). The given name and surname have many variant spellings, including Sweer(s), Sweert(s), Swier(s), Swiert(s), Zweer(s) Zweert(s), and Zwiert(s). Zwiers and Zweers are now the most common forms. People with these surnames include:

 Emanuel Sweert (1552–1612), Dutch botanist and illustrator 
 Jeronimus Sweerts (1603–1636), Dutch still life painter
 Salomon Sweers (1611–1674), Dutch East India Company counsel (Sweers Island was named after him)
 Michiel Sweerts (1618–1664), Flemish painter and printmaker
 Isaac Sweers (1622–1673), Dutch admiral, brother of Salomon ( was named after him)
 Bernard Zweers (1854–1924), Dutch composer and music teacher
 Nel Zwier (1936–2001), Dutch high jumper
 Frank Zweerts (born 1943), Dutch field hockey player
 Jeroen Zweerts (born 1945), Dutch field hockey player, brother of Frank
 Claudia Zwiers (born 1973), Dutch judoka

See also
 6213 Zwiers, main belt asteroid named after Hendrikus Johannes Zwiers (1865–1923), Dutch astronomer at the Leiden Observatory

References

Dutch-language surnames
Patronymic surnames